The Synthemistidae are the family of dragonflies commonly known as tigertails, or sometimes called southern emeralds. This family is sometimes treated as a subfamily of Corduliidae. 
This is an ancient dragonfly family, with some species occurring in Australia and New Guinea. 
Most species are small in size and have narrow abdomens. Their nymphs are bottom dwellers, and resist droughts by burying themselves very deeply. Synthemistid dragonflies frequently prefer marshy areas, as well as fast-flowing streams. The family Synthemistidae is sometimes called Synthemidae.

Genera
The family Synthemistidae includes the following genera:
 Apocordulia 
 Archaeophya 
 Archaeosynthemis 
 Austrocordulia 
 Austrophya 
 Austrosynthemis 
 Choristhemis 
 Cordulephya 
 Eusynthemis 
 Gomphomacromia 
 Hesperocordulia 
 Idionyx 
 Idomacromia 
 Lathrocordulia 
 Lauromacromia 
 Macromidia 
 Micromidia 
 Neocordulia 
 Neophya 
 Nesocordulia 
 Oxygastra 
 Pseudocordulia 
 Syncordulia 
 Parasynthemis 
 Synthemiopsis 
 Synthemis 
 Tonyosynthemis

See also
List of dragonflies (Synthemistidae)
List of Odonata species of Australia

References

Synthemidae - What is a(n) Synthemidae - Encyclopedia.com

External links

 
Odonata families
Odonata of Australia
Odonata of Oceania
Taxa named by Robert John Tillyard